Tim Mayotte was the defending champion but lost in the semifinals to Brad Gilbert.

Amos Mansdorf won in the final 6–3, 6–2, 6–3 against Gilbert.

Seeds
A champion seed is indicated in bold text while text in italics indicates the round in which that seed was eliminated.

  Mats Wilander (first round)
  Tim Mayotte (semifinals)
  Henri Leconte (first round)
  Miloslav Mečíř (second round)
  Thomas Muster (second round)
  Jonas Svensson (second round)
  Guillermo Pérez Roldán (first round)
  Andrei Chesnokov (quarterfinals)

Draw

 NB: The Final was the best of 5 sets while all other rounds were the best of 3 sets.

Final

Section 1

Section 2

External links
 1988 Paris Open Draw

Singles